Marlene Juliette Kaplan (2 October 1939 – 10 October 2019) was a British actress who was most famous for playing the role of Pearl Sibshaw in the BBC comedy Last of the Summer Wine, from 1985 to 2010.

Early years
Kaplan was born in Bournemouth to Jewish parents Pearl (née Cress), a nurse, and Jeremiah Kaplan, a sailor. She spent her early years in South Africa, where her father was from, and moved to New York City when she was nine, before returning to Bournemouth two years later. She took afternoon classes at the Hampshire School of Drama in the town in her teens.

Career
Kaplan worked in many British drama series, including Doctors, Brookside, EastEnders, and London's Burning, and in the film, The Death of Klinghoffer (2003).

Kaplan was in Last of the Summer Wine from 1985 until the very final episode on 29 August 2010 as battle-axe Pearl Sibshaw, and did a tour around British theatres in a one actor show, performing as Pearl. 

She worked in pantomime in December 2008/January 2009 as the Wicked Queen in Snow White at the Empire Theatre, Consett, and at Buxton Opera House.

In early 2015 she was Agnes Tinker in Coronation Street, the grandmother of established character, Beth.

Personal life and death
Kaplan was married to Harold Hoser from 1958 until his death in 1981. They had three children; Mark, Perrina and Tania.

A chain smoker from the age of 14, Kaplan died of cancer at her home in Westgate-on-Sea, Kent on 10 October 2019.

Television roles

Film roles

References

External links
 

1939 births
2019 deaths
Actresses from Hampshire
Deaths from cancer in England
English television actresses
English people of South African-Jewish descent
English soap opera actresses
Jewish English actresses
Actors from Bournemouth
20th-century English actresses
21st-century English actresses
British comedy actresses
People from Westgate-on-Sea